Mary Read (1685 – 28 April 1721), also known as Mark Read, was an English pirate. She and Anne Bonny were two famous female pirates from the 18th century, and among the few women known to have been convicted of piracy at the height of the "Golden Age of Piracy".

Read was born in England in 1685. She began dressing as a boy at a young age, at first at her mother's urging in order to receive inheritance money and then as a teenager in order to join the British military. She then married and upon her husband's death moved to the West Indies around 1715. In 1720 she met Jack Rackham and joined his crew, dressing as a man alongside Anne Bonny. Her time as a pirate was successful but short lived, as she, Bonny and Rackham were arrested in November 1720. Rackham was executed, but Read and Bonny both claimed to be pregnant and received delayed sentences. Read died of a fever in April 1721.

Early life
Mary Read was born in the Kingdom of England in 1685. Her mother had married a sailor and had a son. After her husband disappeared at sea, Mary's mother became pregnant after an extramarital love affair. Read's mother attempted to hide the pregnancy by going to live with friends in the country. Shortly thereafter, her son died, and she gave birth to Mary. This son that she conceived to her missing husband at sea was seen as an accident. The mother of Mary Read was seen with respect by her neighbors and close family and hence this is why she took this leave of absence because of her shame linked with the pregnancy and this son she gave birth to. 

In financial distress, her mother decided to disguise Mary as her dead son, in order to receive monetary support from her late husband's mother. The grandmother was apparently fooled, and mother and daughter lived on the inheritance into Mary's teen years. Dressed as a boy, Read found work as a foot-boy, and, then, employment on a ship.

She later joined the British military, which was after around age 13 and Read found herself joining the crew of a British Man of War. She later quit this and moved into Flanders where she carried Arms in a Regiment of Foot as a cadet and served bravely but could receive commission from her role because they were typically bought and sold she moved onto a Regiment of Horse. Which was allied with Dutch forces against the French (this could have been during the Nine Years War or during the War of the Spanish Succession). Read, in male disguise, proved herself through battle, but fell in love with a Flemish soldier. When they married, she used their military commission and gifts from intrigued brethren in arms to acquire an inn named "De drie hoefijzers" ("The Three Horseshoes") near Breda Castle in The Netherlands.

Upon her husband's early death, Read resumed male dress and military service in the Netherlands. With peace, there was no room for advancement, so she quit and boarded a ship bound for the West Indies. This ship that she boarded for the West Indies happened to be boarded by a pirate ship and her being disguised as a British male helped her and they took her on board with the crew which was British.

Becoming a pirate

Read's ship was taken by pirates, whom she willingly joined. She accepted the King's pardon c. 1718–1719, then took a commission to privateer, but joined the crew in mutiny. In 1720 she joined pirate John "Calico Jack" Rackham and his companion, Anne Bonny, who both believed her to be a man. On 22 August 1720, the three stole an armed sloop named William from port in Nassau. Scholars are uncertain how female pirates like Read and Bonny concealed their sex in a male-dominated environment.  Some scholars, however, have theorized that the wearing of breeches by female pirates may have been either a method of hiding their identity or simply as practical clothing that solidified their working place on board the ship among the other seamen.

When Bonny told Read that she was a woman because she was attracted to her, Read revealed that she too was a woman. To abate the jealousy of her lover, Rackham, who suspected romantic involvement between the two, Bonny told him that Read was a woman. Speculation over the relationship between Bonny and Read led to images depicting the two in battle together.

A victim of the pirates, Dorothy Thomas, left a description of Read and Bonny: They "wore men's jackets, and long trousers, and handkerchiefs tied about their heads: and ... each of them had a machete and pistol in their hands and they cursed and swore at the men to murder her [Dorothy Thomas]." Thomas also recorded that she knew that they were women, "from the largeness of their breasts."

Capture and imprisonment

On 15 November 1720, pirate hunter Captain Jonathan Barnet took Rackham's crew by surprise, while they hosted a rum party with another crew of Englishmen at Negril Point off the west coast of the Colony of Jamaica. After a volley of fire disabled the pirate vessel, Rackham's crew and their "guests" fled to the hold, leaving only the women and one other to fight Barnet's boarding party (it is also possible that Rackham and his crew were too drunk to fight). Allegedly, Read angrily shot into the hold, killing one, and wounding others, when the men would not come up and fight with them. Barnet's crew eventually overcame the women. Rackham surrendered, requesting "quarter".

Rackham and his crew were arrested and brought to trial in what is now Spanish Town, Jamaica, where they were sentenced to hang for acts of piracy, as were Read and Bonny. However, the women claimed they were both "quick with child" (known as "pleading the belly"), and received temporary stays of execution.

Mary Read declared in front of the court that she had never committed Adultery and Fornication with any man of sorts on the ship. She commended the court before her but was ultimately tried after distinguishing the nature of her crimes. One of the pieces of evidence that was included with her crimes was that she was with Rackham and that they fell into discourse when he took read as a young man. 

Read died of a violent fever while in prison. Her 28 April 1721 burial is in the records of St. Catherine's church in Jamaica. There is no record of the burial of her baby, suggesting that she may have died while pregnant.

Modern Interpretations of Mary Read 
Read's stories in many ways draw upon modern concepts such as the independent plebeian woman in the eighteenth century which can include new concepts such as the idea of the cross dressing woman warrior and the female criminal. This all builds into the idea of her being seen as a transatlantic subject.

Cross Dressing Woman Warrior 
Mary Read disguising herself as a man and becoming a pirate in order to pillage and plunder is one thing that can be related to the concept of the cross dressing woman warrior. Anne Bonny also used this disguise to carry on affairs with the men on the ship and this also facilitates this idea of the cross dressing woman.

Female Criminal 
The concept of the female criminal is evident in Mary Read because she was cunning and intuitive and used this to swindle many of the crew members and it is said in the General History of the…Pyrates that she had a “fierce and courageous temper”. This concept is also evident in her life because it is also said in this work that she had a large amount of ambiguity and tenacity in terms of her motivations for piracy.

Transatlantic Subject 
Mary Read being seen as a transatlantic subject draws on the laboring class values, women warrior archetypes, as well as concepts of pirate freedoms. It is clear that Bonny has many options in terms of her mobility and independence. Read also embodies the idea of the transatlantic subject because of the disparate expressions of the impulse to escape imperious British rule  which can also show her shrewdness, practicality, resolveness.

Role in Male Dominated Society 
One last concept that can be interpreted with Mary Read is the idea of how they interacted in what is a predominantly male dominated society. It is known from the little information on the interactions of Mary Read that she supposedly is said to have been at some points better than their male counterparts in being a pirate. They were at times better than them at things such as fighting, drinking, working and this is also what helped Read get away with being a male pirate for so long.

In popular culture

A fictionalized version of Mary Read appears in the 2013 video game Assassin's Creed IV: Black Flag and is voiced by Olivia Morgan. She poses as James Kidd, the illegitimate son of Captain William Kidd, and is a member of the Assassin Order.
The 2006 TV film True Caribbean Pirates featured Mary Read portrayed by Kimberly Adair.
The 1961 Italian film Le avventure di Mary Read told the story of Mary Read, who was portrayed by Lisa Gastoni.
 Mary Read is also portrayed in the Detective Conan animated film Jolly Roger in the Deep Azure along with Anne Bonny.
 Mary Read is a playable character in Fate/Grand Order as a Rider-class and an Archer-class Servant along with Anne Bonny; they are voiced by Ayako Kawasumi (Bonny) and Ai Nonaka (Read).
 Read (Cara Roberts) introduces herself to Anne Bonny under the name of Mark Read in the final episode of Black Sails.
 Mary Read is featured in the song "The Ballad of Mary Read and Anne Bonny" by the Baja Brigade.
 Mary Read is featured in the song "Under the Flag of Mary Read" by Italian metal band Secret Sphere.
 Mary Read and Anne Bonny are featured in the song "Five Guns West" by Adam and the Ants.
 Mary Read and Anne Bonny are featured in the novel The Unbinding of Mary Reade by Miriam McNamara.
 Mary Read appears with Anne Bonny as the primary protagonist in the Well-Behaved Women series of books.
Read  appears with Bonny and Rackham in the Audible serial podcast Hell Cats, by Carina Rodney.
 Mary Read and Anne Bonny appear in the lyrics of the song “5 Guns West” by Adam and the Ants, on their 3rd album Prince Charming (released in November 1981)
Mary Read appears as a companion in the video game Time Princess.

Sculpture
 A wood sculpture, believed to be from the 18th century, of Mary Read is fixed to the front elevation of the 18th-century The Earle Arms public house in Heydon, Norfolk.
 In 2020 a statue of Read and Bonny was unveiled at Execution Dock in Wapping, London. It is planned to eventually bring the statue to Burgh Island in south Devon.

See also
 Women in piracy
 John Bear

References

External links
 
 General History of the Pyrates
 Mary Read article at woa.tv
 Return to Pirate Island, Simon, Ed, JSTOR Daily, August 4, 2021 with several references

1685 births
1721 deaths
18th-century English people
17th-century English women
17th-century English people
18th-century English women
18th-century pirates
Female duellists
Female-to-male cross-dressers
Sailors from London
Prisoners who died in British detention
English prisoners sentenced to death
English people who died in prison custody
Prisoners who died in Jamaican detention
British pirates
Female wartime cross-dressers
Women in the British military
Date of birth unknown
British female pirates
Female
English duellists
Pardoned pirates